Shushan is a city in the Khuzestan province of Iran.

Shushan may also refer to:
 Shushan Airport, former name of New Orleans Lakefront Airport
 Shushan District, a district in Hefei, Anhui, China
 Shushan, New York, United States
 The lower, outer gate of the second Temple in Jerusalem

People with the surname
 Amit Ben Shushan (born 1985), Israeli football player
 John IX bar Shushan (11th century), Syriac Orthodox Patriarch of Antioch
 Naji Shushan (born 1981), Libyan football defender

See also
 Shushan Bridge